José Claudio Antolinez (1635 – 30 May 1675) was a Spanish painter of the Baroque period.

Career and personality
Antolinez was born and died in Madrid. He received his early training at the studio of Francisco Rizi.

His "haughty character and sarcastic personality gained him many enemies among his contemporaries". Some note he played maddening jokes on his colleagues Claudio Coello and Cabezalero as well as Itizi, whom he called painter of wall ornaments, in allusion to the latter's decoration of the hall of comedies in the Palace of Buen Retiro;  but also impelled likely by his jealousy at lacking the same skill. Antolinez also painted religious paintings.

Works

Paintings
Saint Sebastian
Pintor Pobre
A Child (Una niña), oil on panel (58 x 46 cm), Museo del Prado, Madrid 
Huertos Olivos
Adoration of the Magi (around the 1660s)
Death of Lucretia (Muerte de Lucrecia) (1663), Alcalá Subastas, now belongs to the Comyn collection in Barcelona since May 2007
Immaculate (around 1665), Museo de Bellas Artes de Bilbao.
Annunciation (between 1665 and 1675)
Immaculate Conception (La Inmaculada Concepción) (1666), oil on panel 207 x 167 cm, Museo Lázaro Galdiano, Madrid
Bacanal con niños (around 1670), oil on panel, 90 x 136 cm, Museo de Bellas Artes de Córdoba
Éxtasis de la Magdalena (around 1670), National Art Museum of Romania, Bucharest
Inmaculada (around 1670), oil on panel, 213 x 70 cm, Ashmolean Museum, University of Oxford.
Saint Rose of Lima (around 1670), oil on panel, 306 x 150 8, Museum of Fine Arts, Budapest
Suicide of Cleopatra, oil on panel, 137.5 x 115.5 cm, now at the Comyn collection in Barcelona since May 2007
Assumption of Saint Mary
Holy Family
Portrait of a Man
The Liberation of St. Peter, oil on canvas, currently in the National Gallery of Ireland, Dublin.

Other

San Jerónimo Chapel, Jaén Cathedral

References

Angulo Iñíguez, Diego, José Antolínez. Madrid: Instituto Diego Velázquez del Consejo Superior de Investigaciones Científicas, 1957, p. 8.
Buendía, José Rogelio, José Antolínez, pintor de mitologías (José Antolínez: Painter of Myths), Boletín del Museo e Instituto Camón Aznar, no. 1 (1980), p. 45-57.
Gutiérrez Pastor, Ismael, Novedades de pintura madrileña del siglo XVII: obras de José Antolínez y de Francisco Solís, Anuario del Departamento de Historia y Teoría del Arte (UAM), vol. XII (2000), p. 75-92.
Palomino, Antonio (1988). El museo pictórico y escala óptica III. El parnaso español pintoresco laureado. Madrid, Aguilar S.A., p. 338 .

External links
José Antolínez at the Museo del Prado. 

Article at the GER Encyclopedia 

1635 births
1675 deaths
17th-century Spanish painters
Spanish male painters
Spanish Baroque painters
Artists from Madrid
Baroque painters